Greek mathematics refers to mathematics texts and ideas stemming from the Archaic through the Hellenistic and Roman periods, mostly attested from the late 7th century BC to the 4th century AD, around the shores of the Mediterranean. Greek mathematicians lived in cities spread over the entire region, from Anatolia to Italy and North Africa, but were united by Greek culture and the Greek language. The development of mathematics as a theoretical discipline and the use of proofs is an important difference between Greek mathematics and those of preceding civilizations.

Origins and etymology
Strictly speaking, a máthēma could be any branch of learning, or anything learnt; however, since antiquity certain mathēmata (mainly arithmetic, geometry, astronomy, and harmonics) were granted special status.

The origins of Greek mathematics are not well documented. The earliest advanced civilizations in Greece and Europe were the Minoan and later Mycenaean civilizations, both of which flourished during the 2nd millennium BC. While these civilizations possessed writing and were capable of advanced engineering, including four-story palaces with drainage and beehive tombs, they left behind no mathematical documents.

Though no direct evidence is available, it is generally thought that the neighboring Babylonian and Egyptian civilizations had an influence on the younger Greek tradition. Unlike the flourishing of Greek literature in the span of 800 to 600 BC, not much is known about Greek mathematics in this early period—nearly all of the information was passed down through later authors, beginning in the mid-4th century BC.

Archaic and Classical periods

Greek mathematics allegedly began with Thales of Miletus (c. 624–548 BC). Very little is known about his life, although it is generally agreed that he was one of the Seven Wise Men of Greece. According to Proclus, he traveled to Babylon from where he learned mathematics and other subjects, coming up with the proof of what is now called Thales' Theorem.

An equally enigmatic figure is Pythagoras of Samos (c. 580–500 BC), who supposedly visited Egypt and Babylon, and ultimately settled in Croton, Magna Graecia, where he started a kind of brotherhood. Pythagoreans supposedly believed that "all is number" and were keen in looking for mathematical relations between numbers and things. Pythagoras himself was given credit for many later discoveries, including the construction of the five regular solids. However, Aristotle refused to attribute anything specifically to Pythagoras and only discussed the work of the Pythagoreans as a group.

Almost half of the material in Euclid's Elements is customarily attributed to the Pythagoreans, including the discovery of irrationals, attributed to Hippasus (c. 530–450 BC) and Theodorus (fl. 450 BC). The greatest mathematician associated with the group, however, may have been Archytas (c. 435-360 BC), who solved the problem of doubling the cube, identified the harmonic mean, and possibly contributed to optics and mechanics. Other mathematicians active in this period, not fully affiliated with any school, include Hippocrates of Chios (c. 470–410 BC), Theaetetus (c. 417–369 BC), and Eudoxus (c. 408–355 BC).

Greek mathematics also drew the attention of philosophers during the Classical period. Plato (c. 428–348 BC), the founder of the Platonic Academy, mentions mathematics in several of his dialogues. While not considered a mathematician, Plato seems to have been influenced by Pythagorean ideas about number and believed that the elements of matter could be broken down into geometric solids. He also believed that geometrical proportions bound the cosmos together rather than physical or mechanical forces. Aristotle (c. 384–322 BC), the founder of the Peripatetic school, often used mathematics to illustrate many of his theories, as when he used geometry in his theory of the rainbow and the theory of proportions in his analysis of motion. Much of the knowledge about ancient Greek mathematics in this period is thanks to records referenced by Aristotle in his own works.

Hellenistic and Roman periods

The Hellenistic era began in the late 4th century BC, following Alexander the Great's conquest of the Eastern Mediterranean, Egypt, Mesopotamia, the Iranian plateau, Central Asia, and parts of India, leading to the spread of the Greek language and culture across these regions. Greek became the lingua franca of scholarship throughout the Hellenistic world, and the mathematics of the Classical period merged with Egyptian and Babylonian mathematics to give rise to a Hellenistic mathematics.

Greek mathematics and astronomy reached its acme during the Hellenistic and early Roman periods, and much of the work represented by authors such as Euclid (fl. 300 BC), Archimedes (c. 287–212 BC), Apollonius (c. 240–190 BC), Hipparchus (c. 190–120 BC), and Ptolemy (c. 100–170 AD) was of a very advanced level and rarely mastered outside a small circle. There is also evidence of combining mathematical knowledge with technical or practical applications, as found for instance in the work of Menelaus of Alexandria (c. 70–130 AD), who wrote a work dealing with the geometry of the sphere and its application to astronomical measurements and calculations (Spherica). Similar examples of applied mathematics include the construction of analogue computers like the Antikythera mechanism, the accurate measurement of the circumference of the Earth by Eratosthenes (276–194 BC), and the mechanical works of Hero (c. 10–70 AD).

Several centers of learning appeared during the Hellenistic period, of which the most important one was the Musaeum in Alexandria, Egypt, which attracted scholars from across the Hellenistic world (mostly Greek, but also Egyptian, Jewish, Persian, among others). Although few in number, Hellenistic mathematicians actively communicated with each other; publication consisted of passing and copying someone's work among colleagues.

Later mathematicians in the Roman era include Diophantus (c. 214–298 AD), who wrote on polygonal numbers and a work in pre-modern algebra (Arithmetica), Pappus of Alexandria (c. 290–350 AD), who compiled many important results in the Collection, Theon of Alexandria (c. 335–405 AD) and his daughter Hypatia (c. 370–415 AD), who edited Ptolemy's Almagest and other works, and Eutocius of Ascalon (c. 480–540 AD), who wrote commentaries on treatises by Archimedes and Apollonius. Although none of these mathematicians, save perhaps Diophantus, had notable original works, they are distinguished for their commentaries and expositions. These commentaries have preserved valuable extracts from works which have perished, or historical allusions which, in the absence of original documents, are precious because of their rarity.

Most of the mathematical texts written in Greek survived through the copying of manuscripts over the centuries, though some fragments dating from antiquity have been found in Greece, Egypt, Asia Minor, Mesopotamia, and Sicily.

Achievements
Greek mathematics constitutes an important period in the history of mathematics: fundamental in respect of geometry and for the idea of formal proof. Greek mathematicians also contributed to number theory, mathematical astronomy, combinatorics, mathematical physics, and, at times, approached ideas close to the integral calculus.

Eudoxus of Cnidus developed a theory of proportion that bears resemblance to the modern theory of real numbers using the Dedekind cut, developed by Richard Dedekind, who acknowledged Eudoxus as inspiration.

Euclid collected many previous results and theorems in the Elements, a canon of geometry and elementary number theory for many centuries.

Archimedes made use of a technique dependent on a form of proof by contradiction to reach answers to problems with an arbitrary degree of accuracy, while specifying the limits within which the answers lay. Known as the method of exhaustion, Archimedes employed it in several of his works, including to approximate the value of π (Measurement of the Circle), and to prove that the area enclosed by a parabola and a straight line is  times the area of a triangle with equal base and height (Quadrature of the Parabola). Archimedes also showed that the number of grains of sand filling the universe was not uncountable, devising his own counting scheme based on the myriad, which denoted 10,000 (The Sand-Reckoner).

The most characteristic product of Greek mathematics may be the theory of conic sections, which was largely developed in the Hellenistic period, starting with the work of Menaechmus and perfected primarily under Apollonius. The methods employed in these works made no explicit use of algebra, nor trigonometry, the latter appearing around the time of Hipparchus.

Ancient Greek mathematics was not limited to theoretical works but was also used in other activities, such as business transactions and in land mensuration, as evidenced by extant texts where computational procedures and practical considerations took more of a central role.

Transmission and the manuscript tradition

Although the earliest Greek language texts on mathematics that have been found were written after the Hellenistic period, many of these are considered to be copies of works written during and before the Hellenistic period. The two major sources are

 Byzantine codices, written some 500 to 1500 years after their originals, and
 Syriac or Arabic translations of Greek works and Latin translations of the Arabic versions.

Nevertheless, despite the lack of original manuscripts, the dates of Greek mathematics are more certain than the dates of surviving Babylonian or Egyptian sources because a large number of overlapping chronologies exist. Even so, many dates are uncertain; but the doubt is a matter of decades rather than centuries.

Netz has counted 144 ancient authors in the mathematical or exact sciences, from whom only 29 works are extant in Greek: Aristarchus, Autolycus, Philo of Byzantium, Biton, Apollonius, Archimedes, Euclid, Theodosius, Hypsicles, Athenaeus, Geminus, Hero, Apollodorus, Theon of Smyrna, Cleomedes, Nicomachus, Ptolemy, Gaudentius, Anatolius, Aristides Quintilian, Porphyry, Diophantus, Alypius, Damianus, Pappus, Serenus, Theon of Alexandria, Anthemius, and Eutocius.

The following works are extant only in Arabic translations:

Apollonius, Conics books V to VII
Apollonius, De Rationis Sectione 
Archimedes, Book of Lemmas
Archimedes, Construction of the Regular Heptagon
Diocles, On Burning Mirrors
Diophantus, Arithmetica books IV to VII
Euclid, On Divisions of Figures
Euclid, On Weights
Hero, Catoptrica
Hero, Mechanica
Menelaus, Sphaerica
Pappus, Commentary on Euclid's Elements book X
Ptolemy, Optics (extant in Latin from an Arabic translation of the Greek)
Ptolemy, Planisphaerium

See also

Notes

References

External links

Vatican Exhibit
Famous Greek Mathematicians